André Casas (17 September 1934 – 6 April 2021) was a French rugby league footballer who played as .

Career
He played for several clubs during his career, starting for Avignon, with which he won the Lord Derby Cup in 1956, later, for XIII Catalan with a Lord Derby Cup in 1959 and finally, for Lézignan, winning a French Championship title in 1963. 
Thanks to his club performances, he won two caps for France between 1959 and 1960, taking part to the 1960 Rugby League World Cup.

Personal life
Outside the field, he worked as a municipal employee.

Honours
Team honours:
French Champion in 1963 (Lézignan)
Winner of the Lord Derby Cup in 1956 (Avignon) and 1959 (XIII Catalan)

References

External links
André Casas at rugbyleagueproject.com

1934 births
2021 deaths
French rugby league players
Sporting Olympique Avignon players
XIII Catalan players
Lézignan Sangliers players
Sportspeople from Pyrénées-Orientales
Rugby league hookers
France national rugby league team players